SFI Rajasthan  is the State Committee (state wing) of the Students' Federation of India

(SFI) serving in the state of Rajasthan.

References

External links 
 Official website

Student organisations in India
1970 establishments in India
Student organizations established in 1970
Communist Party of India (Marxist)
Volunteer organisations in India
Student wings of communist parties of India